Royal Lane station is a DART Light Rail in Dallas, Texas. The station opened as part of the Green Line's expansion in December 2010. It serves nearby attractions such as the Asian Trade District.

References

External links 
Dallas Area Rapid Transit - Royal Lane Station

Dallas Area Rapid Transit light rail stations in Dallas
Railway stations in the United States opened in 2010
Railway stations in Dallas County, Texas